Sistrunk is a surname. Notable people with the surname include:

Manny Sistrunk (born 1947), American football player, distant cousin of Otis
Otis Sistrunk (born 1946), American football player

See also
Sistrunk operation, treatment for removing a thyroglossal cyst